Gianfranco Circati (born 2 February 1971) is an Italian footballer.

Circati played for a number of teams in Italian football with the majority of his career being in Serie B and Serie C, though he did have a stint in Serie A with Parma F.C.

References

1971 births
Living people
People from Fidenza
Italian footballers
Serie A players
National Soccer League (Australia) players
Cosenza Calcio 1914 players
U.S. Fiorenzuola 1922 S.S. players
S.S.D. Varese Calcio players
Cagliari Calcio players
Calcio Padova players
Modena F.C. players
Parma Calcio 1913 players
Perth Glory FC players
Ravenna F.C. players
U.S. Salernitana 1919 players
Calcio Foggia 1920 players
Expatriate soccer players in Australia
Association football forwards
Sportspeople from the Province of Parma
Footballers from Emilia-Romagna